Eulepidotis flavipex is a moth of the family Erebidae first described by Paul Dognin in 1914. It is found in the Neotropics, including Costa Rica, French Guiana and Guyana.

References

Moths described in 1914
flavipex